Château-l'Évêque (Limousin: Lo Chasteu) is a commune in the Dordogne department in Nouvelle-Aquitaine in southwestern France. Château-l'Évêque station has rail connections to Bordeaux, Périgueux and Limoges.

Population

Castle
The castle of Chateau-L'Eveque was built in the 14th century by the bishop of Périgueux, and was partly destroyed and restored in the 15th and 16th centuries. The park and castle are open to visitors.

See also
Communes of the Dordogne department

References

Communes of Dordogne